Çayırbaşı Stadium is a football stadium at Çayırbaşı neighborhood of Sarıyer district in Istanbul Province, Turkey owned and run by the Municipality of Sarıyer. Built in 2002, it has a seating capacity for 5,000 spectators. The ground is artificial turf.

The stadium is currently used for football matches only, and it is the home ground of Kireçburnu Spor women's football team.

References

Football venues in Turkey
Sports venues in Istanbul
Buildings and structures in Istanbul Province
Sports venues completed in 2002
2002 establishments in Turkey
Sport in Sarıyer